Keitarō is a Japanese given name. The spelling varies.

People

啓太郎
Keitarō Arima (born 1969), manga artist, author of Tsukuyomi -Moon Phase- among others
Izawa Keitaro, member of Appa and the band Tokyo Incidents

慶太郎
Motonaga Keitaro, director of the anime To Heart: Remember My Memories, Amaenaideyo!!, Lovely Idol, Iczer Girl Iczelion, Kikaider 01: The Animation, Yumeria, GetBackers, Magic Knight Rayearth OVA and School Days

敬太郎
Keitarō Takanami, founder and former member of pop group Pizzicato Five

To be sorted
Kondo Keitaro, author, recipient of the Akutagawa Prize
Keitaro Konnai (born 1978), swimmer
Keitaro Hara, chief equipping officer on the Japanese cruiser Haguro and later captain of Japanese battleship Ise and then Japanese battleship Nagato
Keitaro Hoshino (born 1969), boxer
Inoue Keitaro, martial artist, see Tenjin Shin'yō-ryū
Keitaro Miho, one of the composers for the film Les plus belles escroqueries du monde

Characters

景太郎
Keitarō Urashima, main protagonist of the manga Love Hina

敬太郎
Keitarō Shido, character in the tokusatsu television series Kamen Rider (Skyrider)
Keitarō Jin, character in the tokusatsu television series Kamen Rider X
Takeda Keitarou, character in the manga Majin Tantei Nōgami Neuro

啓太郎
Keitarō Kikuchi, character in the tokusatsu television series Kamen Rider 555

To be sorted 
 Keitarō Kiyomasa, character in the manga The Kindaichi Case Files.
 Keitarō Mizuno, character in the anime Texhnolyze.
 Keitaro Sasakawa, character in the drama series Tokyo Friends.
 Keitarō Toukichi, character in the manga Princess Comet.

Japanese masculine given names